Chad Kelton Williams (born January 22, 1979) is an American football coach and former player. He played professionally as a safety for five seasons in the National Football League (NFL).

He attended college at the University of Southern Mississippi. He played for the Baltimore Ravens from 2002 to 2005 and San Francisco 49ers in 2006. In his five years in the NFL, Williams played in 79 career games, six of which he started. He had 164 tackles and 9 interceptions. In addition, he scored three touchdowns, recorded 7 sacks, and deflected 25 pass attempts.

Williams was selected by the Baltimore Ravens in the sixth round of the 2002 NFL Draft. On May 3, 2006, he signed with the San Francisco 49ers as an unrestricted free agent. The Kansas City Chiefs signed Williams in June 2007, but he did not play for the team.

Williams formerly served as the defensive coordinator/linebackers coach for the University of Central Arkansas.

In December 2020 it was announced that Williams was joined new head coach Will Hall's inaugural staff at Williams' alma mater, Southern Miss. He will be the defensive backs coach.

References

External links
 Southern Miss profile

1979 births
Living people
American football safeties
Baltimore Ravens players
Central Arkansas Bears football coaches
Jacksonville State Gamecocks football coaches
Kansas City Chiefs players
Middle Tennessee Blue Raiders football coaches
Morehouse Maroon Tigers football coaches
San Francisco 49ers players
Savannah State Tigers football coaches
Southern Miss Golden Eagles football coaches
Southern Miss Golden Eagles football players
Valdosta State Blazers football coaches
West Alabama Tigers football coaches
West Georgia Wolves football coaches
Sportspeople from Birmingham, Alabama
Coaches of American football from Alabama
Players of American football from Birmingham, Alabama
African-American coaches of American football
African-American players of American football
21st-century African-American sportspeople
20th-century African-American sportspeople